Fort Wallace ( 1865–1882) was a US Cavalry fort built in Wallace County, Kansas to help defend settlers against Cheyenne and Sioux raids. All that remains today is the cemetery, but for a period of over a decade Fort Wallace was one of the most important military outposts on the frontier.

Fort Wallace Museum

Today, Fort Wallace is represented by a privately operated museum nearby in the town of Wallace, with relics from the fort as well as photos, reproduction items, and literature covering the post's history and the settlement of the Great Plains. A casting of the plesiosaur discovered by Turner and Scout William Comstock is also on display. Facades of some of the buildings from Fort Wallace and from the Old Town of Wallace are featured in the Milford Becker Addition opened in 2017.

Location

References

External links
 Fort tours
 Fort Wallace
 Fort Wallace Attacked, June 22nd, 1867

Wallace
Buildings and structures in Wallace County, Kansas
1865 establishments in Kansas